Hebeloma fusipes is a species of mushroom in the family Hymenogastraceae.

fusipes
Fungi of Europe
Taxa named by Giacomo Bresadola